Deh Chah Rural District is a rural district (dehestan) in Poshtkuh District, Neyriz County, Fars Province, Iran. At the 2006 census, its population was 3,980, in 1,049 families.  The rural district has 20 villages.

References 

Rural Districts of Fars Province
Neyriz County